The flag of Bandung is the official flag of the city of Bandung. It was adopted on June 8, 1953 and has a proportion of 7:5. The flag consists of three equal horizontal stripes of green, yellow, and blue. Green represents coolness and prosperity, yellow represents welfare of the people, and blue represents loyalty. The flag is similar to the flag of Gabon. The flag is often found wrapped around trees instead of flying on a flagpole.

See also
 Coat of arms of Bandung

References

Bandung
Flags of Indonesia
Bandung
Bandung